Bidokht (also Romanized as Bīdokht and Bīdukht) is a village in Shakhenat Rural District, in the Central District of Birjand County, South Khorasan Province, Iran. At the 2006 census, its population was 219 people in 81 families.

References 

Populated places in Birjand County